The 2018 Turkmenistan Cup is the 25th season of the Turkmenistan Cup knockout tournament. The cup winner qualifies for the 2019 AFC Cup.

The draw of the tournament was held on 11 July 2018.

First round

1st leg

2nd leg

Quarter-finals

1st leg

2nd leg

Semi-finals

1st leg

2nd leg

Final

References

External links
Official website
Turkmenistan Cup 
Football of Turkmenistan, VK.com

Turkmenistan Cup
Turkmenistan
Turkmenistan Cup